When Spring Makes a Mistake or Cuando la primavera se equivoca is a 1944 Argentine film directed by Mario Soffici.

Cast
Elisa Galvé
José Olarra
Juan José Miguez
Felisa Mary
Elina Colomer
Homero Cárpena
Juan Carrara
Juan José Piñeiro
Eugenia Rico
Matilde Rivera
Rosa Rosen

External links
 

1944 films
1940s Spanish-language films
Argentine black-and-white films
Films directed by Mario Soffici
Argentine comedy films
1944 comedy films
1940s Argentine films